The 1963 European Judo Championships were the 12th edition of the European Judo Championships, and were held in Geneva, Switzerland on 10 and 11 May 1963. The Championships were held in two separate categories: amateur (five events) and professional (four events). The amateur contests were subdivided into four individual competitions, and a separate team competition. The Soviet and other Socialist judokas were allowed to compete professionally but on a strictly non-profit basis. As before, more than one representative of a single national team were allowed to qualify for participation in each event.

Medal overview

Amateurs

Amateur medal table

Professionals

Professional medal table

Teams

Overall medal table

References 

 Results of the 1963 European Judo Championships (JudoInside.com)

E
European Judo Championships
1963 in Swiss sport
Sports competitions in Geneva
Judo competitions in Switzerland
20th century in Geneva
International sports competitions hosted by Switzerland
May 1963 sports events in Europe